Ashish Sharma is an Indian film and television actor and the founder of Rachayita Films. He is recognized for his role of Prithvi Vallabh in Prithvi Vallabh - Itihaas Bhi, Rahasya Bhi, Rama in Siya Ke Ram, Major Rudra Pratap Ranawat in Rangrasiya, Ranveer Singh/Fateh Singh Rathore/Jeet Singh in Rab Se Sohna Isshq, and Chandragupta Maurya in Chandragupta Maurya.

Career 
Ashish Sharma began his film career with the 2010 Hindi film Love Sex Aur Dhokha. He made his television debut the same year when he starred as the male lead in Imagine TV's Gunahon Ka Devta.

He played Chandragupta Maurya in the historical drama series Chandragupta Maurya. He also appeared as Ranveer in Zee TV's Rab Se Sohna Isshq.

It was in 2014 that his character Major Rudra Pratap Ranawat, a BSD (border security) officer, on Colors TV show RangRasiya, that garnered him both critical and popular appreciation and making him a household name. He was the winner of Season 7 of dance reality show Jhalak Dikhhla Jaa in 2014 partnered with choreographer Shampa Sonthalia. He was also the host of the radio show Tujhse Naaraaz Nahin Zindagi.

He was last seen on Sony TV's Prithvi Vallabh - Itihaas Bhi, Rahasya Bhi in 2018. Post taking a break from television, Sharma and wife Archana Taide produced feature film Khejdi, a film about a transgender played by Sharma himself in 2018. The film had participated in various International Film festivals and won neaumrous awards including the Award for Best Actor at NYC South Asian Film Festival 2019.

In 2019, Sharma essayed the role of India’s Prime Minister, Narendra Modi  in Umesh Shukla's directorial web series, Modi – A Journey of a Common Man. The series was released on Eros Now in 2019 and Season 2 was released in 2020.

In 2022 his movie Hindutva, written and directed by Karan Razdan was released. He is currently producing and acting in untitled web series along with Gulshan Grover and Sonarika Bhadoria in lead roles.

Personal life 
Sharma was born and raised in Jaipur. On 30 January 2013, Sharma married television actress Archana Taide in Jaipur.

Filmography

Television

Films

Web series

Awards

See also 

 List of Indian television actors

References

External links 
 
 

21st-century Indian male actors
Indian male film actors
Indian male television actors
Living people
Year of birth missing (living people)